Ciara Storey is a camogie player, winner of All-Ireland Senior medals in 2010 and 2011.

Family background
Ciara is daughter of Martin Storey, Wexford's All-Ireland winning Senior hurling captain of 1996.

Other awards
National Camogie League medals in 2009, 2010 and 2011; National League Div two 2009. Leinster Championship 2009, 2010, 2011. Three All-Ireland Féile na nGael 2000, 2001, 2002; Winner of Leinster and All-Ireland Senior medals in Colleges with Coláiste Bríde\ 2003, 2004, 2005; All-Ireland Junior Colleges with [http://www.colaistebride.ie/ Coláiste Bríde 2004; Club Senior 2003, 2004, 2005, 2006, 2007, 2009; Leinster Club Senior 2009; All Ireland club sevens 2006; Leinster Under-14 2002.

References

External links
 Camogie.ie Official Camogie Association Website
 Wexford Wexford camogie site

1990 births
Living people
Wexford camogie players